Yollada "Nok" Suanyot (birth name: Krirkkong Suanyos; born June 18, 1983)  is a Thai politician and celebrity. On May 27, 2012, she was elected to represent Mueang Nan District on the Provincial Administration Organization for Nan Province in Thailand, running as an independent politician. Previous to entering politics, Suanyot had been a model and beauty queen, and was a member of the pop group Venus Flytrap, where she performed under the name "Nok". Suanyot is a transgender woman and founded and chairs the TransFemale Association of Thailand, which advocates for transgender rights. Because of the lack of legal recognition for transgender people in Thailand, her male name as designated at birth has appeared on the ballot. Suanyot graduated with a science degree from Thammasat University when she was 21, holds a master's degree in political science, and is currently working toward a Ph.D. in social science at Ramkhamhaeng University.

References

External links
TransFemale Association of Thailand

Yollada Suanyot
Yollada Suanyot
Yollada Suanyot
Transgender politicians
Transgender female models
Living people
1983 births
Transgender women musicians
Yollada Suanyot